This is a list of comics-related events in 1978.

Events

Year overall 
 DC suffers the DC Implosion, the abrupt cancellation of more than two dozen ongoing and planned titles, including All Star Comics, Aquaman,  House of Secrets, Our Fighting Forces, Showcase, and  The Witching Hour. The vast majority of the books leave uncompleted story lines (most of which are later wrapped up in other titles).
 Archie Goodwin resigns as Marvel Comics editor-in-chief, replaced by Jim Shooter (who will hold the post until mid-1987).
 Underground publisher the Print Mint stops publishing comics.
 "The Korvac Saga" story arc, written by Jim Shooter and David Michelinie, with art by George Pérez and David Wenzel, runs through The Avengers, beginning in issue #167 (February) and running through issue #177 (November)
 "The Cursed Earth" Judge Dredd storyline runs in 2000 AD (May – October)

January 
 Green Lantern #100: Double-size special featuring Green Lantern, Green Arrow, Black Canary, and Air Wave. (DC Comics).
 The first episode of L’uomo di Tsushima (The man of Tsushima) by Bonvi is published, a retelling of the famous battle as seen by Jack London, for the series Un uomo un’avventura (Bonelli).

February 
 February 2: Belgian comics artist Maurice Tillieux is killed in a car crash.
 The first issue of the Belgian comics magazine À Suivre is published. It will run until December 1997. 
 In the first issue of A Suivre the first chapter of Jean-Claude Forest and Jacques Tardi's Ici Même (Just Here) makes its debut. 
 Detective Comics #475, "The Laughing Fish" by Steve Englehart, Marshall Rogers, and Terry Austin. (DC Comics)
 February 8: Marvel UK publish Star Wars Weekly in a black-and-white anthology format.

March 
 2 March: In Spirou, the first chapter of the Yoko Tsuno episode La fille du vent, by Roger Leloup, is published.
 21 March: In Pilote, the first chapter of the Valérian story Heroes of the Equinox by Pierre Christin and Jean-Claude Mezieres is published.
 In the second issue of À Suivre Benoît Sokal's Inspector Canardo makes its debut. 
 Dennis O'Neil and Neal Adams' comic book Superman vs. Muhammad Ali is published, in which Superman meets boxing champion Muhammad Ali.

April
18 April: In the Le journal de Tintin, the first chapter of the second Thorgal story The island of frozen seas by Jean Van Hamme and Grzegorz Rosiński is published.
20 April: In Spirou, the first chapter of Kodo le tyran, by Jean-Claude Fournier is published.
Claw the Unconquered, with issue #10 (April /May), is revived by DC after an 18-month hiatus.
 Power Man, with issue #50, changes its name to Power Man and Iron Fist.

May
14-21 May: In Topolino, The planetary wars, by Guido Martina and Giovan Battista Carpi, a spoof of Star Wars, is published.
 May 19: Scripps Company merges its two syndication arms, Newspaper Enterprise Association and United Feature Syndicate (established by Scripps in 1919), to form United Media Enterprises.
Showcase #100: "Awesome Anniversary Edition! 60 Sensational Super-Stars" — featuring almost every character who ever appeared in Showcase — by Paul Kupperberg, Paul Levitz, and Joe Staton.
 IPC Magazines publishes the first issue of the short-lived comics magazine Starlord

June
 Continuing the "DC Explosion," the company increases its titles' page counts to 25 story pages and increases the price of a typical comic from 35 cents to 50 cents.
 Batman #300: "The Last Batman Story—?", by David V. Reed, Walt Simonson, and Dick Giordano.
 Garfield, by Jim Davis is launched on June 19 in 41 newspapers.
 In the magazine Cannibale RanXerox by Tanino Liberatore makes its debut.

Summer 
 DC Special Series #15 — "I Now Pronounce You Batman and Wife!", marriage of Batman and Talia al Ghul, by Dennis O'Neil, Michael Golden, and Dick Giordano. See also Batman: Son of the Demon

July 
 4 July : In Tintin magazine, the first chapter of the Jonathan story L'Espace bleu entre les nuages (The blue space amongst the clouds) by Cosey, the fifth episode of the series, is published.

August
 The DC Implosion takes hold, as the company cancels 4 ongoing titles, Aquaman, Claw the Unconquered, Mister Miracle, and Shade, the Changing Man.
 Fledgling publisher Eclipse Comics releases Sabre: Slow Fade of an Endangered Species, by Don McGregor and Paul Gulacy, considered one of the industry's first "graphic novels".
 With issue #10 The Rampaging Hulk changes its title to The Hulk!, and goes from black-and-white to color (Curtis Magazines).

Fall 
 DC Special Series #16 — "The Last Bounty Hunter!", death of Jonah Hex, by Michael Fleisher and Russ Heath.  DC Special Series goes on hiatus after this issue and is revived in Summer 1979.

September
 September 7: The first episode of Frank Pé's Broussaille is published in Spirou. 
 September 30: Martin Lodewijk receives the Stripschapprijs.
 Suffering from the DC Implosion, the company cancels 8 ongoing titles, All Star Comics, Battle Classics,  Black Lightning, Doorway to Nightmare,  Dynamic Classics,  Kamandi: The Last Boy on Earth, Showcase, and Our Fighting Forces. In addition, DC cuts back comic story pages to 17, and the typical cover price to 40 cents.
 Gold Key Comics, with issue #19, picks up Flash Gordon (1966 series) from Charlton Comics, which had stopped publishing the title in 1970.
 After many delays, DC releases All-New Collectors' Edition #C-56, featuring the story Superman vs. Muhammad Ali.
 In Pilote, the first chapter of The black order brigade by Pierre Christin and Enki Bilal is published.

October
 The DC Implosion forces the company to cancel 6 more ongoing titles, Firestorm, the Nuclear Man, House of Secrets, Secrets of Haunted House, Star Hunters, Steel: The Indestructible Man, and The Witching Hour.
 Will Eisner's graphic novel A Contract with God is published by Baronet Books. An early landmark of the graphic novel form.
 Will Eisner's "Signal From Space" storyline begins in Spirit Magazine #19 (continuing through issue #26, October 1980).
 In À Suivre, Milo Manara's HP and Giuseppe Bergman, is first published.
October 14: IPC Magazines merged two comic books: 2000 AD and Starlord into "2000 AD and Starlord".
October 15: The Dutch comics organisation Het Stripschap holds a dinner to celebrate their 10th anniversary. During the event one of their guests, Dick Matena, starts making a scene while drunk. The incident will become legendary afterwards.
 Diane Noomin releases the collective comic book Lemme Outa Here! Growing Up Inside the American Dream, published by Print Mint.

November
 November 22: In Belgium the Vlaamse Onafhankelijke Stripgilde (Flemish Independent Comics Guild) is founded, with cartoonist Eddy Ryssack as their first president. 
 Fantastic Four #200: Double-sized anniversary issue, "When Titans Clash!" by Marv Wolfman, Keith Pollard, and Joe Sinnott. (Marvel Comics)
L’uomo delle nevi (The snowman), by Alfredo Castelli and Milo Manara, for the series Un uomo un’avventura (Bonelli).
 In Il mago Soviet secret agent Ivan Timbrovic by Massimo Cavezzali makes his debut.
First volume of the Storia d’Italia a fumetti di Enzo Biagi (Enzo Biagi’s History of Italy in comics), drawn by some of the best Italian cartoonists (Milo Manara, Sergio Toppi, Dino Battaglia).

December 
Kamillo Kromo, book for children by Francesco Tullio Altan.
 Art Spiegelman creates Ed Head, published in Playboy on an irregular basis until November 1981.

Births

Deaths

January
 January 1: Don Freeman, American comics artist, painter, illustrator and children's novelist (Corduroy), passes away at age 61.
 January 9: Tijs Dorenbosch, Dutch comics artist (Sjefke Schrober, Henkie van 't Grijze Nest, Pieternel, Heintje Hups en Honkie), dies at age 66. 
 January 18: Clark Haas, American comics artist, animator and animation producer (Sunnyside, assisted on Buz Sawyer and Tim Tyler's Luck), dies at age 58.

February
 February 1: Roland Kohlsaat, German illustrator and comics artist (Jimmy das Gummipferd, Julios Abenteuerliche Reisen), dies at age 64. 
 February 2: Maurice Tillieux, Belgian comics artist (Félix, Gil Jourdan), dies in a car accident at age 56.
 February 5: Frans Van Immerseel, Belgian painter, caricaturist, cartoonist, illustrator and comics artist (De Lotgevallen van Janssens), dies at age 68.
 February 7: Enrique Rapela, Argentine comics artist (Cirilo El Audaz), dies at age 67.
 February 9: 
 Woody Gelman, American animator, comics artist, novelist and publisher (The Dodo and the Frog, co-creator of Bazooka Joe), dies of a stroke at age 62.
 Warren King, American comics artist (The Firefly), passes away at age 62.
 February 19: Gisela Zimmermann, German comics artist (continued Digedags and Abrafaxe), dies at age 65 of heart failure.
 February 21: Pol Dom, Belgian-Dutch illustrator, sculptor, caricaturist and comic artist (made comics for the jam factory De Betuwe), dies at age 92. 
 February 28: Glenn Chaffin, American comics writer (Tailspin Tommy), passes away at age 80.

March
 March 3: Frank Fogarty, American comics artist (Mr. & Mrs., continued Clarence), dies at age 80.
 March 8: Tjeerd Bottema, Dutch illustrator and comics artist (Er Was Eens Een Oud Vrouwtje), dies at age 94.
 March 30: István Köpeczi Bócz, Hungarian poster designer, costume designer,  illustrator and comics artist, passes away at age 58.

April
 April 9: Elmer Woggon, American comics artist (Big Chief Wahoo (Steve Roper and Mike Nomad)), dies at age 79.
 April 14: André Beautemps, Belgian comics writer and artist (Michael Logan), dies at age 29. 
 April 29: Louis Zansky, American comics artist (worked for Classics Illustrated), dies at age 57.

May
 May 11: Clinge Doorenbos, Dutch comedian, singer, songwriter, children's novelist, poet, journalist and comics writer (Flippie Flink ), passes away at age 93. 
 May 17: Mort Weisinger, American comics editor (Superman, co-creator of Aquaman, Green Arrow and Johnny Quick), dies at age 63.
 May 27: Jo Spier, Dutch illustrator and cartoonist, passes away at age 77.

June
 June 22: William Reusswig, American illustrator and comics artist (made comic adaptations of novels), dies at age 75.

July
 July 5: Paul Cuvelier, Belgian comics artist and painter (Corentin, Epoxy), dies at age 54.

August
 August 1: Geoffrey William Backhouse, British illustrator and comics artist, dies at age 74.

September
 September 9: Barbara Shermund, American cartoonist (Shermund's Sallies), dies at age 79.

October
 October 4: Sezgin Burak, Turkish comics artist (Tarkan), passes away at age 43.
 October 10: J.R. Bray, American animator and comics artist (Singing Sammy, Mr. O.U. Absentmind, Colonel Heeza Liar), dies at the age of 99.

November
 November 8: Norman Rockwell, American painter and illustrator (made a few sequential illustrations in his career), dies at the age of 84.
 November 20: Tom Okamoto, aka Tom Oka, aka Tom Mako, Japanese-American animator and comics artist (Deems, Little Brave, continued Li'l Neebo), dies at age 62. 
 November 21: Orhan Ural, Turkish comics artist (Pazar Ola Hasan Bey), dies at age 64 or 65.

December
 December 4: Brian Lewis, British illustrator, comics artist and animator (The Suicide Six, continued Jet Ace Logan),  dies at age 49.
 December 6: Dick Dreux, aka Rod Draga, Dutch novelist, radio writer and comics artist (Raket-Ridders), dies at age 65.
 December 28: Hi Mankin, American comics artist (the Roy Rogers newspaper comic, Hanna-Barbera comics, assisted on The Adventures of Smilin' Jack, Bringing Up Father, Buz Sawyer, Dotty Dripple), passes away at age 51 or 52 from a heart attack.
 December 31: Arsène Brivot, French comics artist and illustrator (Jojo Richissime), dies at age 80.
 December 31: Basil Wolverton, American comics artist (Mad Magazine, Powerhouse Pepper), dies at age 69.
 Specific date unknown: Jacques Gagnier, Canadian caricaturist, comics artist, children's book illustrator and cartoonist (La Vie en Images), dies at age 61.

Specific date unknown
 Aldo De Amicis, Italian comics artist (worked for Il Vittorioso), dies at age 74 or 75.
 Al Fago, American comics artist (Atomic Mouse, Atomic Rabbit, Timmy the Timid Ghost), dies at age 73 or 74.
 Frank Fogarty, American comics artist (Mr. & Mrs., continued Clarence), dies at age 90 or 91.
 Henry Le Monnier, French illustrator and comics artist (made various realistic adventure comics), dies at age 84 or 85.

Conventions
 Lancaster Comic Art Convention (Lancaster, Pennsylvania) — produced by Chuck Miller and Charlie Roberts
 Summer: Atlanta Fantasy Fair (Dunfey's Royal Coach, Atlanta, Georgia) — official guests included Stan Lee, Jim Starlin, Howard Chaykin, Jim Steranko
 June 23–25: Houstoncon (Houston, Texas) — guests include Frankie Thomas, Kirk Alyn, Ron Goulart, Gil Kane, Jenette Kahn, Frank Brunner, Ray Harryhausen, Greg Jein, Kerry Gammill, Jim Newsome, and Paula Crist
 July 2–5: Comic Art Convention I (Americana Hotel, New York City)
 July 8–9: Comic Art Convention II (Philadelphia, Pennsylvania)
 July 14–16: Chicago Comicon (Pick-Congress Hotel, 520 South Michigan Avenue, Chicago, Illinois) — 3rd annual convention under that name
 July 26–30: San Diego Comic-Con (El Cortez Hotel, San Diego, California) — show reaches attendance mark of 5,000 for the first time. Official guests: John Buscema, Howard Chaykin, Shary Flenniken, Alan Dean Foster, Gardner Fox, Steve Gerber, Burne Hogarth, Greg Jein, Bob Kane, Gray Morrow, Clarence "Ducky" Nash, Grim Natwick, Wendy Pini, Frank Thorne, Boris Vallejo
 July 29–30: Comicon '78 (British Comic Art Convention) (Bloomsbury Centre Hotel, London, England) — "10th anniversary special;" guests include Don McGregor (guest of honor), George Pérez, Jim Salicrup, Duffy Vohland, Brian Bolland, John Bolton, Brian Lewis, Trevor Goring, Dez Skinn, and Dave Gibbons; 2nd annual presentation of the Eagle Awards
 September: OrlandoCon (Orlando, Florida) — guests include Will Eisner, Bob Clampett, Les Turner, Ralph Dunagin, C. C. Beck, Edmund Good, Bill Black, Morris Weiss, Ralph Kent, Bill Crooks, and Zack Mosley
 September 2–3: Albany Comic Con (Turf Inn, Colonie, New York) — tentative guest list included Joe Sinnott, Joe Staton, and Al Milgrom
 September 2–3: Comicon II (British Comic Art Convention II) (Imperial Hotel, Birmingham, UK) — Guest of honor: Dave Cockrum (did not show), other guests: Paul Neary, Hunt Emerson, Chris Welch
 November 13–15: OAF SF & Nostalgia Show 1978 (Tradewinds Hotel, Oklahoma City, Oklahoma) — science fiction/nostalgia convention staged by the Oklahoma Alliance of Fans, producers of Multicon
 November 17–19: Delaware Valley Comicart Consortium Third Annual Convention Honoring Women in Comics (Philadelphia, Pennsylvania) — guests included Paty, Mary Jo Duffy, Wendy Pini, Frank Thorne, Boris Vallejo, and Bill Ward
 November 24–26: Creation '78 (Statler Hilton, New York City) — guests include John Byrne, Howard Chaykin, Jim Steranko, Herb Trimpe, Gray Morrow, Bob Larkin, John Romita, Sr., John Romita, Jr., Gene Colan, Rudy Nebres, and Tom Yeates
 December 1–3: Wintercon '78 (Tradewinds Hotel, Oklahoma City, Oklahoma)
 December 29: Albany Comic Con II (Albany, New York)

Awards

Eagle Awards 
Presented in 1979 for comics published in 1978:

 Roll of Honour: Steve Englehart

American section 
 Favourite Writer: Chris Claremont
 Favourite Artist: John Byrne
 Favourite Inker: Terry Austin
 Favourite Comic Book (Drama): Uncanny X-Men (Marvel Comics)
 Favourite New Comics Title: Micronauts
 Favourite Single Story: "Mindgames",  Uncanny X-Men #111, by Chris Claremont and John Byrne
 Best Continuing Story: "The Korvac Saga", in The Avengers #167, 168, 170–177, written by Jim Shooter and David Michelinie, with art by George Pérez and David Wenzel
 Favourite Cover: Master of Kung Fu #67, by Paul Gulacy
 Favourite Team: X-Men
 Favorite Supporting Character: Wolverine
 Favourite Villain: Magneto
 Character Most Worthy of His Own Title: Silver Surfer
 Favourite Specialist Comics Publication: Comic Media News

U.K. section 
 Favourite Writer: T.B. Grover
 Favourite Artist: John Bolton
 Favourite Comic: 2000 AD (Fleetway)
 Favourite Character: Judge Dredd

First issues by title

DC Comics 
Army at War
 Release: November. Editor: Paul Levitz. (Immediately cancelled as a victim of the DC Implosion.)

Battle Classics
 Release: September/October. Writer: Robert Kanigher. Artist: Joe Kubert. (Immediately cancelled as a victim of the DC Implosion.)

DC Comics Presents
 Release: July. Writer: Martin Pasko. Artists: José Luis García-López and Dan Adkins.

Doorway to Nightmare
 Release: January/February. Writer: David Michelinie. Artist: Val Mayerik.

Dynamic Classics
 Release: September/October. Editor: Cary Burkett. (Reprint title immediately cancelled as a victim of the DC Implosion.)

Firestorm, the Nuclear Man
 Release: March. Writer: Gerry Conway. Artist: Al Milgrom.

Steel: The Indestructible Man
 Release: March. Writer: Gerry Conway. Artists: Don Heck and Joe Giella.

Marvel Comics 
Devil Dinosaur
 Release: April. Writer/Artist: Jack Kirby.

Machine Man
 Release: April. Writer/Artist: Jack Kirby.

Man From Atlantis
 Release: February. Writer: Bill Mantlo. Artists: Tom Sutton and Sonny Trinidad.

Spider-Woman
 Release: April. Writer: Marv Wolfman. Artists: Carmine Infantino and Tony DeZuniga.

Other publishers 
1984
 Release: June by Warren Publishing. Editor: Bill DuBay.

Anarchy Comics
 Release: by Last Gasp. Editor: Jay Kinney.

À Suivre magazine Release: February by Casterman.Elfquest
 Release: August by WaRP Graphics. Writers: Wendy Pini and Richard Pini. Artist: Wendy Pini.

Il Male

Release: February 7, Director : Vincino.

Misty

 Release: February 4 by Fleetway.

Starlord
 Release: May 13 by IPC Media.

Canceled titles

DC Comics 
 All Star Comics,  with issue #74 (September/October)
 Aquaman, with issue #63 (August/September)
 Army at War, with issue #1 (November )
 Batman Family, with issue #20 (November ) — folded into the newly reformatted DC Dollar Comic Detective Comics
 Battle Classics,  with issue #1 (September/October)
 Black Lightning,  with issue #11 (September/October)
 Challengers of the Unknown, with issue #87 (June/July)
 Claw the Unconquered, with issue #12 (August/September)
 DC Super Stars, with issue #18 (January /February )
 Doorway to Nightmare,  with issue #5 (September/October) — folded into the DC Dollar Comic The Unexpected
 Dynamic Classics,  with issue #1 (September/October)
 Firestorm, the Nuclear Man, with issue #5 (October/November)
 Freedom Fighters, with issue #15 (July/August)
 House of Secrets, with issue #154 (October/November)
 Kamandi: The Last Boy on Earth,  with issue #59 (September/October)
 Karate Kid, with issue #15 (July/August)
 Metal Men, with issue #56 (February /March )
 Mister Miracle,  with issue #25 (August )
 Our Fighting Forces, with issue #181 (September/October)
 Return of The New Gods, with issue #19 (July/August) — the numbering had continued from the New Gods 1971 series, which itself had been cancelled in 1972.
 Secret Society of Super Villains, with issue #15 (June/July)
 Secrets of Haunted House, with issue #14 (October/November) — revived a year later, however, with issue #15; the title continues until issue #46 in March 1982.
 Shade, the Changing Man, with issue #9 (August/September)
 Shazam!, with issue #35 (May/June) — folded into the DC Dollar Comic World's Finest
 Showcase, with issue #104 (September ) — the numbering had continued from the first volume of Showcase, which itself had been cancelled in 1970.
 Star Hunters, with issue #7 (October/November)
 Steel: The Indestructible Man, with issue #5 (October/November)
 Super-Team Family, with issue #15 (March/April) — the basic concept is reborn a few months later with the July debut of DC Comics Presents
 Teen Titans, with issue #53 (February )
 Welcome Back, Kotter, with issue #10 (March/April)
 The Witching Hour, with issue #85 (October ) — folded into the DC Dollar Comic The Unexpected

Marvel Comics 
 The Champions, with issue #17 (January)
 Devil Dinosaur, with issue #9 (December)
 The Eternals, with issue #19 (January)
 Kull the Destroyer, with issue #29 (October)
 Marvel Classics Comics, with issue #36 (December)

Other publishers 
 Bullet, with issue #147 (D. C. Thomson & Co. Ltd, December ) — merged with Warlord
 Ghostly Haunts, with issue #58 (April, Charlton)
 Krazy, with issue #79 (IPC, April 15) — merged with Whizzer and Chips
 The Many Ghosts of Doctor Graves, with issue #65 (Charlton, May) — the title picks up again with issue #66 in May 1981
 Starlord, with issue #22 (IPC Media, October 7)

Initial appearances by character name

DC Comics 
 Harold Jordan, in Green Lantern #48 (January)
 Cinnamon, in Weird Western Tales #48 (September /October )
 Commander Steel, in Steel, the Indestructible Man #01
 Count Vertigo, World's Finest Comics #251
 Doctor Mist, in Super Friends #12
 Fadeaway Man, in Detective Comics #479
 Firestorm, in Firestorm, the Nuclear Man #01
 Martin Stein, in Firestorm, the Nuclear Man #01
 Ronald Raymond, in Firestorm, the Nuclear Man #01
 Killer Frost, in Firestorm, the Nuclear Man #03
 Madame Xanadu, in Doorway to Nightmare #01 (February)
 Madame Zodiac, in Batman Family #17
 Multiplex, in Firestorm, the Nuclear Man #02
 Ultraa, in Justice League of America #153
Jed Rikane, in Superboy and the Legion of Super-Heroes #240 (June)
Preston Payne, in Detective Comics #477 (June)
Odd Man (comics), in Cancelled Comic Cavalcade #02 (September)

Marvel Comics 
 Arcade, in Marvel Team-Up #65 (January)
 Big Wheel, in The Amazing Spider-Man #182
 Bethany Cabe, in Iron Man #117
 Carrion, in Spectacular Spider-Man #25
 Devil Dinosaur, in Devil Dinosaur #1 (April)
 Vindicator (later Guardian), in Uncanny X-Men #109
 Hoder, in Thor #274
 Hypno-Hustler, in Spectacular Spider-Man #24
 Kiber the Cruel, in Black Panther #11 (September)
 Moon-Boy, in Devil Dinosaur #1 (April)
 Moonstone, in The Incredible Hulk #228
 Mystique, in Ms. Marvel #16
 Ben Urich, Daredevil #153
 Virako, in Thor Annual #7
 Wendell Vaughn (Marvel Man), in Captain America #217 (January)

References